Carex cumberlandensis is a tussock-forming species of perennial sedge in the family Cyperaceae. It is native to eastern parts of the United States.

See also
List of Carex species

References

cumberlandensis
Plants described in 2001
Flora of Alabama
Flora of Arkansas
Flora of Kentucky
Flora of Indiana
Flora of Georgia (U.S. state)
Flora of North Carolina
Flora of South Carolina
Flora of Ohio
Flora of Virginia
Flora of West Virginia
Flora of Tennessee